S.K. Karvendhan (born 10 May 1948) was a member of the 11th Lok Sabha of India of Tamilmannila Congress party in 1996-1998 and member of Indian National Congress Party 14th Lok Sabha2004 to 2009 . He represented the Palani constituency of Tamil Nadu when he was a member of the Indian National Congress (INC) political party. Later he joined Tamil maanila Congress led by G.K.Vasan but on 13 September 2016 he joined Bharatiya Janata party where he is party's State spokesperson He is one of the "top three performers in the 14th Lok Sabha (all 14 sessions combined)". He came out of INC and joined BJP.Now he is the head of BJP OBC Morcha Tamilnadu.

References
 

Living people
Indian National Congress politicians from Tamil Nadu
Lok Sabha members from Tamil Nadu
1948 births
India MPs 2004–2009
People from Dindigul district